Smash and Grab is a 1937 British comedy crime film directed by Tim Whelan and starring Jack Buchanan, Elsie Randolph, with Arthur Margetson and Anthony Holles. The film was released in the United States as Larceny Street. The film was shot at Pinewood Studios with sets designed by the art director Douglas Daniels.

It was followed by a sequel in 1939 The Gang's All Here with Buchanan reprising his role and Googie Withers starring as his wife.

Plot
Private detective John Forrest is hired by an insurance company to hunt down a criminal gang on a spree of smash and grab raids on London jewellers. Together with his wife Alice, he tracks the robbers to a Dublin barbershop that's used for fencing the stolen gems.

Cast
 Jack Buchanan as John Forrest
 Elsie Randolph as Alice Thornby
 Arthur Margetson as Malvern
 Anthony Holles as Polino
 Edmund Willard as Cappellano
 Lawrence Grossmith as Rankin
 Zoe Wynn as Carole
 Edward Lexy as Inspector McInerney
 Nigel Fitzgerald as Cosgrove
 Laurence Hanray as Praskins
 Sara Seegar as Miss Quincey
 David Burns as Bellini
 George Carney as Engine Driver
 Peter Gawthorne as Insurance Company Chairman
 Edmon Ryan as Barman

References

External links

Smash and Grab at Britmovie

1937 films
British crime comedy films
Films directed by Tim Whelan
Films shot at Pinewood Studios
1930s crime comedy films
Films set in London
British black-and-white films
1937 comedy films
1930s English-language films
1930s British films